Ovation is an American television network whose focus is on the fine arts and contemporary culture. The network is owned by Ovation LLC, which is made up of a joint venture of Hubbard Media Group, and the private-equity funds Corporate Partners II, Arcadia Investment Partners, and Perry Capital.

, approximately 54 million households (46.4 percent of those with television) had access to Ovation.

History
The channel was launched in 1996, mainly with spread-out coverage throughout the country and no satellite carriage, with its major coverage with the urban base of Time Warner Cable. Under this form, its carriage was limited, as cable providers did not see much popularity or requests for the arts-based network, as had been seen in the past with networks like CBS Cable, or former arts networks that went for a more broad-based focus, including Bravo and A&E.

On August 30, 2006, the network's assets were purchased by a consortium made up of the  Hubbard family and The Weinstein Company. In June 2007, the network was re-launched, coinciding with its addition by DirecTV, which gave the channel full national coverage. In 2008, Ovation also became available on Dish. With the relaunch, Ovation TV claimed an "energetic" new look and a new primetime schedule revolving around "genre nights" dedicated to performance, people, and film. "TV" was dropped from its branding on March 1, 2010. The network launched in high definition in July 2010, utilizing the 1080i format.

The network's investment by The Weinstein Company would come into question in October 2017, when Harvey Weinstein's sexual assault and abuse allegations came to light. Two weeks after the first public reports, the network's board notified Harvey Weinstein on October 24 that he would be expelled from any further involvement in Ovation. Shortly after, TWC's interest in the network was fully terminated, saving Ovation LLC from the legal battle to come with TWC's bankruptcy.

Carriage 
On December 18, 2012, Time Warner Cable announced plans to remove Ovation from its own systems as well as those operated by Bright House Networks (whose carriage agreements were negotiated by Time Warner). Time Warner Cable and BHN dropped Ovation at midnight Eastern Time on December 31, 2012. The two providers later reached an agreement to resume carriage of Ovation on October 16, 2013, reinstating the channel on TWC and BHN systems on January 1, 2014.

The network was carried on Dish until April 6, 2015, when it was removed from that provider at a nadir for the network where it originated little to no programming and had drifted towards carrying low-prestige Hollywood films out of format. Providers refused to renew the network under this guise, and by 2017, it had begun to acquire overseas and prestige product anew to avert the network's demise.

Programming
Ovation programming is a mix of original and acquired television series, films, documentaries and specials, targeting a multi-generational audience.

Current programming

Former programming

References

Television networks in the United States
Hubbard Broadcasting
English-language television stations in the United States
Television channels and stations established in 1996
The Weinstein Company
1996 establishments in the United States